The Oratory of the Compagnia di San Bernardino is a place of worship in the Piazza San Francesco in Siena. Elevated to minor basilica status in 1925 by Pope Pius XI, it adjoins rooms housing the diocesan museum. It is notable for its frescoes from various 16th- and 17th-century Sienese painters like Sodoma and Domenico Beccafumi. The oratory is almost adjacent to the Basilica of San Francesco, Siena.

History

The confraternity was first recorded in 1273 when it was dedicated to the Virgin Mary and Francis of Assisi. It was rededicated as the Compagnia della Madonna della Veste Nera di San Francesco in the 14th century and then as the Compagnia di San Bernardino in 1450 after Bernardino of Siena's canonisation, around which time it began building an oratory.

Interiors
The upper oratory was decorated in 1496 with engraved wood panelling and ceilings. The wall frescoes were completed a team of painters, and include:
Il Sodoma: 
St Ludovico
Presentation of Mary at the Temple
St Francis of Assisi
Visitation of Mary and Anne
Coronation of the Virgin 
Domenico Beccafumi
Marriage of the Virgin
Glory of the Virgin
Madona in Glory with Saints
Girolamo del Pacchia
Birth of Mary
St Bernardino
Archangel Gabriel of the Annunciation
Sano di Pietro
Madonna
There is a marble bas-relief of the Madonna with Angels, by Agostino di Giovanni.

The lower oratory contains 16th century terracotta statues depicting St Bernardino and St Catherine of Siena, as well as Andrea del Brescianino’s Madonna and Child With Saints Ansanus and Bartholomew. The lower oratory has frescoes depicting Life of San Bernardino.

The Diocesan Museum is next door to the oratory.

References

Bibliography
Toscana. Guida d'Italia (Guida rossa), Touring Club Italiano, Milano 2003. 
Anna Maria Francini Ciaranfi, Beccafumi, Sadea Editore/Sansoni, Firenze 1967.

Painting in Late Medieval and Renaissance Siena, 1260–1555, by Diana Norman, page 261.
The Story of Siena and San Gimignano, by Edmund Garratt Gardner, page 285.

Roman Catholic churches in Siena
Renaissance architecture in Siena
Paintings by Domenico Beccafumi
Paintings by Il Sodoma
Paintings of the Virgin Mary
Museums in Siena